Allured was the first Archdeacon of Barnstaple.

References

Archdeacons of Barnstaple